Idlout is a surname. Notable people with the surname include:

Joseph Idlout (1912/13–1968), Canadian Inuit
Lori Idlout (born 1973/74), Canadian politician
Lucie Idlout (born 1972/73), Canadian singer-songwriter, granddaughter of Joseph